The Zoram People's Movement (abbreviated ZPM) is an alliance of seven party to form non Indian National Congress non Mizo National Front government formed by Mizoram People's Conference . It is an alliance movement, the members are Mizoram People's Conference Zoram Nationalist Party, Zoram Exodus Movement, Zoram Decentralisation Front, Zoram Reformation Front and Mizoram People's Party. Later all these parties merged into a single entity. In 2018 Mizoram Legislative Assembly election, it has emerged as movement group and support some independent candidate with same symbol, flag and policy and won 8 seats. Zoram People's Movement was reformed as a political party from movement group.

 

The largest and founder party  Mizoram People's Conference left the alliance in 2019 due to ZPM became a political party.

In 2020 some member of ZNP left the alliance due to election of their party issue relating to forming new party leader/OB and reform Zoram Nationalist Party(ZNP).

Office Bearers

President: Pu Lalliansawta
 Working President: Pu K Sâpdanga
Vice Presidents: Pu Dr. Kenneth Chawngliana, Pu Lalthansanga, Rev. Dr. K. Thanzauva.
Treasurer: Pu C. Laltanpuia.

History
Zoram People's Movement (ZPM) contested 36 out of 40 seats in Mizoram assembly polls, and won 8 seats in the recent 2018 Mizoram Legislative Assembly election. The Zoram People's Movement has been created to create a political alternative to the Mizo National Front and the Indian National Congress in Mizoram. They fought the election on the platform of re-imposing a ban on liquor. The Zoram people's movement was officially registered with Election Commission of India in July 2019 after submitting a request on January 21, 2019.

References

Political parties in Mizoram
Political parties established in 2018
2018 establishments in Mizoram
Recognised state political parties in India